was a Sengoku period warrior in 16th century Japan. He was the eighth son of warlord Oda Nobuhide and his wife, Tsuchida Gozen. His mother also gave birth to three of his older brothers: Oda Nobunaga, Oda Nobuyuki and Oda Nobukane.

He was killed by Oda Nobutsugu while riding his horse along the Shōnai River near Moriyama Castle.

Family
Father: Oda Nobuhide (1510–1551)
Mother: Tsuchida Gozen (died 1594)
Brothers
Oda Nobuhiro (died 1574)
Oda Nobunaga (1534–1582)
Oda Nobuyuki (1536–1557)
Oda Nobukane (1548–1614)
Oda Nagamasu (1548–1622)
Oda Nobuharu (1549–1570)
Oda Nobutoki (died 1556)
Oda Nobuoki  
Oda Hidenari
Oda Nobuteru
Oda Nagatoshi
Sisters:
Oichi (1547–1583)
Oinu

1555 deaths
Samurai
Oda clan
Year of birth unknown